Edmund F. Mansure (March 14, 1901 – January 25, 1992) was an American businessman who served as Administrator of the General Services Administration from 1953 to 1956.

He died of Alzheimer's disease on January 25, 1992, in Menlo Park, California at age 90.

References

1901 births
1992 deaths
Administrators of the General Services Administration
Illinois Republicans
Eisenhower administration personnel